Eupithecia nigribasis is a moth in the  family Geometridae. It is found in Cameroon, the Democratic Republic of Congo, Equatorial Guinea, Kenya and South Africa.

References

External links

Moths described in 1902
nigribasis
Moths of Africa